Barzilauskas is a surname. Notable people with the surname include:

Carl Barzilauskas (born 1951), American football player
Fritz Barzilauskas (1920–1990), American football player